Cadle Monolith is a conspicuous, somewhat isolated, bare rock monolith or headland, standing at the east end of Condor Peninsula,  southeast of Cape MacDonald, on the east coast of Palmer Land. It was mapped by the United States Geological Survey in 1974, and named by the Advisory Committee on Antarctic Names for Gary L. Cadle, a U.S. Navy electrician at Palmer Station in 1973.

References 

Headlands of Palmer Land